K.F.C. Sparta Petegem is a Belgian professional football club based in Petegem-aan-de-Leie, registered with the Belgian FA under matricule 3821. The club's full name is 	Koninklijke Football Club Sparta Petegem ) and it has green and black as club colours.

History
On 1 February 1928 F.C. Sparta Petegem was founded, with club colours purple and white. In 1946, the club merged with neighbouring Padro Deinze to form Football Club Deinze, at which point the colours were changed to green and black. The club reverted to the name F.C. Sparta Petegem in 1950.

The first major success on the pitch occurred during the 1957–58 season when the club managed to reach the highest provincial level for the first time. That season the club also won the national fair-play award. During the 1960s the club first declined before returning to the highest provincial level in 1966 and towards the end of the decade, for one season, it even played at a higher level than neighbours Deinze. The local rivals quickly recovered, which resulted in fiercely contested derby matches for a number of seasons until 1977. In that year, Deinze managed to obtain promotion while at the same time Sparta Petegem was relegated to the second provincial division and started struggling, even dropping to the third provincial level in 1986 and only narrowly avoiding yet another relegation the season thereafter.

The club started its climb to higher levels in 1993, winning promotion to the second provincial division, managed to move up to the highest provincial level where it remained nine seasons before finally reaching the national level of Belgian football for the first time in its history in 2008, moving into the Belgian Fourth Division. In the meantime, the club had obtained the Royal designation since 2000 and had therefore been renamed K.F.C. Sparta Petegem from that season.

Following a short return to the provincial leagues for the 2013–14 season, the club then managed to successive promotions to again reach its highest level ever, with the Belgian Third Division. Despite a top-half finish, the club dropped again to the fourth level of Belgian football due to the 2016 reform of Belgian football. The club has since then been playing at this level, the Belgian Division 2.

References 

Association football clubs established in 1928
Football clubs in Belgium
1928 establishments in Belgium